Live In Hyde Park is concert film recorded by blues-rock guitarist Eric Clapton on 29 June 1996 in London's Hyde Park. The concert was presented by the MasterCard Masters of Music for The Prince's Trust and featured songs from right across his career. The VHS of the footage from the concert was released in 1997, followed by a DVD version in 2001.

Track listing (DVD) 
1. Layla (Eric Clapton, Jim Gordon) 
2. Badge (Eric Clapton, George Harrison) 
3. Hoochie Coochie Man (Willie Dixon) 
4. I Shot The Sheriff (Bob Marley) 
5. It Hurts Me Too (Elmore James) 
6. Wonderful Tonight (Eric Clapton) 
7. Five Long Years (Eddie Boyd) 
8. Tearing Us Apart (Eric Clapton, Greg Phillinganes) 
9. Old Love (Eric Clapton, Robert Cray) 
10. I'm Tore Down (Freddie King) 
11. Have You Ever Loved A Woman (Billy Myles) 
12. White Room (Jack Bruce, Pete Brown)
13. Every Day I Have The Blues (T-Bone Walker) 
14. Holy Mother (Eric Clapton, Stephen Bishop)

The VHS release omits "Hoochie Coochie Man" and "It Hurts Me Too".

Personnel

Eric Clapton – electric guitar · acoustic guitar · vocals
Dave Bronze – Bass Guitar
Steve Gadd – Drums
Andy Fairweather Low – Guitars · vocals
Jerry Portnoy – Harmonica
Chris Stainton – Keyboards
Roddy Lorimer · Simon Clarke · Tim Sanders – The Kick Horns
Katie Kissoon · Tessa Niles – Backing Vocals
The East London Gospel Choir
Julia Knowles – Director
Harvey Goldsmith – Executive producer
Michele Hockley – Producer
David May – Producer
Edward Simons – Producer
Ray Still – Executive producer (Warner Music Vision)
Dave Gardener – Film editing
Dennis Arnold – Event production manager
Annie Crofts – Production manager

Mike Double – Event production manager
Mnicholike Double – Production manager
Jonathan Park – Set designer · stage designer
Simon Climie – 5.1 Surround production
Mick Guzauski – 5.1 Surround mixer
Chris Hedges – Sound engineer
Chris Hey – Sound consultant
Bob Ludwig – Mastering
Steve May – Monitor engineer
Dave Porter – Sound mixer
Will Shapland – Sound mixer
David Woolley – Sound mixer
Nick Brown – Audio stage tech
Chris Hedges – Live audio engineering
Steve May – Live audio engineering
Nick Brown – Live audio engineering
Tom Kenny – Lighting designer · lighting operator
Phil Piotrowsky – Camera supervisor

Naomi Neufeld – Vision mixer
Clive Brinkworth – Guitar technician
Lee Dickson – Guitar technician
Richard Sharman – Drum technician
Vincent Baker – Keyboard technician
Chuck Crampton – Site coordinator (Unusual Services)
Ivan Douglass – Floor manager
Roger Forrester – Manager
Alan Jacobi – Site coordinator (Unusual Services)
Steve Jones – Stage manager
Brian Lee – DVD authoring · graphics
Penny Marciano – DVD production coordinator
Katie McCann – Production coordinator
Manique Ratner – Assistant to director
Julie Sykes – Floor manager
Tony Wheeler – Site coordinator (Unusual Services)
Raena Winscott – DVD production coordinator
Gateway Mastering

Chart positions

Weekly charts

Certifications

References

Eric Clapton live albums
1997 live albums
Warner Records live albums
1997 video albums
Live video albums
Warner Records video albums
Eric Clapton video albums